Jhonny Víctor Vidales Lature (born 22 April 1992 in Lima) is a Peruvian footballer, who plays primarily as a forward. He currently plays for Cusco.

Club career
Jhonny Vidales was moved to Alianza Lima's first team in January 2012. On matchday 1, he made his league debut in the Torneo Descentralizado playing from start in the 2–2 draw at home against León de Huánuco. He played in the reserves until being called up by manager José Soto for his second league match, which was in matchday 20 in a 0–0 draw away to Unión Comercio. In his ninth game with Alianza, Vidales scored his first league goal on 2 August 2012 in the derby match at home against Sporting Cristal, which finished a 1–1 draw.

On 16 August 2014, Johnny Vidales signed a three-year contract with Marítimo.

International career
Vidales received his first call up to play for the Peru national team on 27 September 2012.

References

External links 

1992 births
Living people
Footballers from Lima
Peruvian footballers
Association football wingers
Club Alianza Lima footballers
Peruvian Primera División players
Peruvian expatriate footballers
Expatriate footballers in Italy
Parma Calcio 1913 players
Expatriate footballers in Slovenia
ND Gorica players
C.S. Marítimo players
Primeira Liga players
Expatriate footballers in Portugal
Sport Huancayo footballers
Club Deportivo Universidad César Vallejo footballers
FBC Melgar footballers
Peru international footballers